Bathyclarias atribranchus is a species of airbreathing catfish endemic to Lake Malawi, in the countries of Malawi, Mozambique and Tanzania.  This species grows to a length of 60 cm TL (23.6 inches).

References
 

Bathyclarias
Fish of Africa
Taxa named by Humphry Greenwood
Fish described in 1961
Taxonomy articles created by Polbot